Dia is surname and given name.

Persons

Surname
Ali Dia (born 1965), Senegalese footballer
Amadou Dia Ba (born 1958), former Senegalese athlete
Boulaye Dia (born 1996), Senegalese footballer
Fabé Dia (born 1977), French-Italian athlete 
Issiar Dia (born 1987), French footballer
Mamadou Dia (1910–2009), the first Prime Minister of Senegal
Mamadou Chérif Dia (born 1984), Senegalese athlete
Modou Dia (born 1950), Senegalese politician
Mohamed Dia (born 1973), fashion creator
Omar Dia (born 1955), Senegalese basketball player
Pape Cire Dia (born 1980), Senegalese footballer
Tidiane Dia (born 1985), Senegalese football player
Yero Dia (born 1982), French football player

Given name 
Dia Chakravarty (born 1984), British political activist
Dia Frampton (born 1987), lead singer of the American band, Meg & Dia
Dia Kurosawa, fictional character from the media-mix project Love Live! Sunshine!!
Dia Mirza (born 1981), Indian model and actress

Surnames of Senegalese origin
Surnames of Mauritanian origin
Surnames of Malian origin